Azerion is a Dutch-Turkish venture capital company that sells and publishes digital advertising in online and mobile video games. The company was founded in 2014 by Atilla Aytekin and Umut Akpinar.

History 
Aytekin and Akpinar met at the Turkish student association at TU Delft. In 2004, they founded Triodor Software and Orange Games later the same year before renaming it Azerion. Initially, Azerion focused their efforts on casual gaming development. In 2018, the company added monetization and ad sales to their platforms.

Azerion became a publicly traded company listed on Euronext Amsterdam in February 2022 following a merger with EFIC1, an already publicly traded Special Purpose Acquisition Company (SPAC) . Almost immediately, the value of its shares declined. Since this merger, it has dropped from a high of €10,00 to €7,50 as of July 2022, a decline of 25%. Co-founder Atilla Aytekin made an insider purchase of €5 million of the company’s stock in quarter 2 of 2022.

Azerion currently claims to serve more than 500 million unique monthly active users and 400.000 advertisers and has in its portfolio more than 19.000 game titles across 4.800 game portals. Azerion announced its support for the Ukrainian war effort against Russia in March 2022 and made donations to Ukraine 555, an aid campaign based in the Netherlands.

References 

Dutch companies established in 2014